Barbara Mazzel Anne Perry (born 6 April 1964) is a former Australian politician, representing Auburn for the Labor Party in the New South Wales Legislative Assembly from 2001 to 2015. Perry was the first woman of Lebanese origin to be elected to the New South Wales Legislative Assembly.

Early years and background
One of five children, Perry is the daughter of Lebanese immigrants, Ralph and Susan Abood, and is married to Michael Perry with five sons. She was educated by the Sisters of Charity and the Marist Brothers before graduating in law from the University of Sydney, commencing work with the Legal Aid Commission of New South Wales in 1990.

Political career
Perry was elected in a by-election on 8 September 2001 following the resignation of Labor Member Peter Nagle and re-elected at the 2003, 2007 and 2011 state elections.

Following the 2007 state election, Perry was appointed Minister for Juvenile Justice, Minister for Western Sydney and Minister Assisting the Premier on Citizenship in the second Iemma ministry, serving until December 2008. In December 2009, Perry was appointed to the Keneally ministry as Minister for Local Government and Minister Assisting the Minister for Mental Health, taking on the additional responsibilities of Minister for Juvenile Justice in June 2010. Perry retained these portfolios until the 2011 state election when Labor was defeated at the polls. Subsequently, Perry was appointed Shadow Minister for Family and Community Services, Shadow Minister for Aboriginal Affairs and Shadow Minister for Ageing and Disability Services.

On 7 January 2015, after a bitter pre-selection contest, Perry announced that she would not seek Labor endorsement for the 2015 state election. She stood down in order to make way for newly elected leader Luke Foley to have a clear run for her seat. Foley needed to contest a Legislative Assembly seat as he was a member of the Legislative Council.

References

1964 births
Australian Labor Party members of the Parliament of New South Wales
Australian people of Lebanese descent
Living people
Members of the New South Wales Legislative Assembly
Politicians from Sydney
21st-century Australian politicians
Women members of the New South Wales Legislative Assembly
21st-century Australian women politicians